The FA Cup 1954–55 is the 74th season of the world's oldest football knockout competition; The Football Association Challenge Cup, or FA Cup for short. The large number of clubs entering the tournament from lower down the English football league system meant that the competition started with a number of preliminary and qualifying rounds. The 30 victorious teams from the Fourth Round Qualifying progressed to the First Round Proper.

Preliminary round

Ties

Replays

1st qualifying round

Ties

Replays

2nd replay

2nd qualifying round

Ties

Replays

2nd replay

3rd qualifying round

Ties

Replays

4th qualifying round
The teams that given byes to this round are Walthamstow Avenue, Yeovil Town, Gainsborough Trinity, Witton Albion, Weymouth, Rhyl, Hereford United, Wigan Athletic, Blyth Spartans, Wellington Town, Bath City, Peterborough United, Great Yarmouth Town, Headington United, Bedford Town, Hastings United, Kettering Town, Guildford City, Spennymoor United, Horden Colliery Welfare, Nuneaton Borough, Cambridge United, Selby Town and Newport I O W.

Ties

Replay

1954–55 FA Cup
See 1954–55 FA Cup for details of the rounds from the First Round Proper onwards.

External links
 Football Club History Database: FA Cup 1954–55
 FA Cup Past Results

Qualifying
FA Cup qualifying rounds